The 2003 French Figure Skating Championships took place between 13 and 15 December 2002 in Asnières-sur-Seine. Skaters competed at the senior level in the disciplines of men's singles, women's singles, pair skating, ice dancing, and synchronized skating. The event was used to help determine the French team to the 2003 World Championships and the 2003 European Championships.

Results

Men

Ladies

Pairs

Ice dancing

External links
 results

French Figure Skating Championships
French Figure Skating Championships, 2003
French Figure Skating Championships
French Figure Skating Championships
French Figure Skating Championships